Naya Nangal is a town, near Rupnagar city and the Bhakhra Dam in Rupnagar district of Punjab, India. It is part of Nangal, and is a planned town having sectors similar to the city Chandigarh. The town was created for employees of National Fertilizers. It has a railway station and a market divided sector wise. Along with that it covers Shivalik avenue . This town lies on the foothills of Himalayas as low lying plains with adjacent scenic beauty. It includes Sutlej River,Nangal Dam,Migratory Siberian protected birds, N.F.L. colony,P.A.C.L. colony,,ShivaliK Avenue.And rich history associated with Jawaharlal Nehru visits, British town planning.

Naya Nangal has sector-1, sector-2, sector-4, sector-5, sector-7, where NFL Govt. Employee lives with their families.

References

Cities and towns in Rupnagar district